The Cao'e Temple (Chinese:曹娥庙) was built to honor Cao E, a young girl who was drowned when she tried to save her father in an act of filial piety. The temple was built for the first time in the year 151, and has been relocated, rebuild, restored and expanded several times. The last time this temple was rebuilt was in 1929 after a huge fire, the restoration lasted until 1936.

Location and description
The Cao'e Temple is situated in the Shangyu District, Shaoxing, Zhejiang Province, China. The temple faces to the east and overlooks the Cao'e River, with on the rear side of the temple a view of the Phoenix mountain. The temple is built on an area of 6000 square meters, the temple itself measures 3840 square meters. Inside the temple, several wall paintings have been created describing the story of Cao E. The temple has been built with many stone carving and wood carving.

In 1093 Emperor Song Zhezong had a main hall built in the temple. There are more than 30 steles donated by famous people and exhibited in the temple in honor of Cao E, some of these famous people are: Mi Fu, Tang Yin, Zhu Yunming, Wen Zhengming, Chiang Kai-shek.

Cultural
The Cao'e Temple has a rich cultural heritage of nearly 2,000 years and has a high artistic taste, and is renowned at home and abroad for its carvings, murals, couplets and calligraphy. Since 1989, the Cao'e Temple has been included in the list of protected national and cultural relics. Every year from May 15–22, there is a festival in the Cao'e Temple, with a Cao E memorial service at the temple on May 22. The temple is called the first temple of Jiangnan.

Photo Gallery

References and notes

Website
 

Temples in China
Buildings and structures completed in 1929
Buildings and structures in Shaoxing